Jona may refer to:
 Jona, Switzerland, a village of the municipality Rapperswil-Jona, Switzerland
 Jona (river), in the cantons of Zürich and St. Gallen in Switzerland
 Jona (album), an album by Jona Viray

People with the given name
 Jona (actress), Bangladeshi film actress
 Jona (footballer), Honduran footballer 
 Jona Bechtolt (born 1980), American electronic musician
 Jona Lendering (born 1964), Dutch historian
 Jona Lewie (born 1947), English singer
 Jona Senilagakali (born 1929), Prime Minister of Fiji
 Jona Soquite (born 2003), Filipina singer
 Jona von Ustinov (1892–1962), German journalist
 Jona Weinhofen (born 1983), Australian guitarist
 Jona Viray (born 1989), Filipino singer

People with the surname
 Giovanni Jona-Lasinio (born 1932), Italian physicist
 Walter Jona (1926–2007), Australian politician

See also
 Jonah (disambiguation)
 Yona (disambiguation)